is a district located in Okayama Prefecture, Japan.

As of May 1, 2004, the population was 17,888. The area is 123.63 km2.

Towns and villages
Nagi
Shōō

History
Prior to February 28, Katsuta District consisted of:

Katsuta
Nagi
Shōboku
Shōō

As of 2003, the district had an estimated population of 29,056 and a density of 113.58 persons per km2. The total area was 255.82 km2.

On February 28, 2005, Shōboku left Katsuta District and became part of the city of Tsuyama.
On March 31, 2005, Katsuta left Katsuta District and became part of the city of Mimasaka.

Districts in Okayama Prefecture